The 2016 Tour de Hongrie was a six-day cycling stage race that took place in Hungary in June–July 2016. The race is the 37th edition of the Tour de Hongrie. It was rated as a 2.2 event as part of the 2016 UCI Europe Tour. The race included 5 stages plus the prologue, starting in Szombathely on 28 June and returning there for the finish on 3 July in Budapest.

The winner of overall classification was Mihkel Räim. The selection was made on Stage 1 to Keszthely.

Schedule

Participating teams
16 teams were invited to the 2016 Tour de Hongrie: 7 UCI Continental, 4 Regional and 5 Hungarian teams.

Stages

Prologue
28 June 2016 — Szombathely, individual time trial (ITT)

Stage 1
29 June 2016 — Fertőd (Eszterházy Palace) to Keszthely (Festetics Palace),

Stage 2
30 June 2016 — Keszthely to Siófok,

Stage 3
1 July 2016 — Cegléd to Karcag,

Stage 4
2 July 2016 — Karcag to Kékestető,

Stage 5
3 July 2016 — Gyöngyös to Budapest (Buda Castle),

Classification leadership

Final standings

General classification

Points classification

Mountains classification

Young riders classification

Team classification

Sponsorship
 Radio broadcasting organization, Rádió Rock 95.8FM, has sponsored the  sárga trikó (General classification Winner).
 Hungarian Cycling Federation, Bringasport, has sponsored the  zöld trikó (Point classification Winner).
 Active tourist portal, has sponsored the  piros trikó (Mountain classification Winner).
 The leader Hungarian bank, OTP Bank, has sponsored the  fehér trikó (Young rider classification Winner).
 Ministry of Human Resources

 szelektalok.hu
 Bringaland
 Opel – official car of the Race
 Szerencsejáték Zrt.
 belotto – official jersey manufacturer
 Europcar
 Soudal
 Kunság-Szesz Zrt.
 Tissot – official timekeeper

See also

 2016 in men's road cycling
 2016 in sports

References

External links
 Official website

2016
Tour de Hongrie
Tour de Hongrie